The Salto Osório Hydroelectric Power Plant is a dam and hydroelectric power plant on the Iguazu River near Osório in Paraná, Brazil. It is the second dam upstream of the Iguazu Falls and was completed in 1979. The power station has a 1,078 MW capacity and is supplied with water by a rock-fill embankment dam.

It is owned and operated by Tractebel Energia.

Salto Osório Dam
Each spillway is on the main structure and the northern spillway contains 4 floodgates with 5 located next to the power station.

Power plant
The power plant at the southern end of the dam contains six hydroelectric generators powered by Francis turbines. Four of the turbines were manufactured by Mitsubishi and the other two turbines were manufactured by Hitachi. The first generator was commissioned on October 17, 1975, with another later that year, two in 1976, another in 1980 and the final June 21, 1981. Tractebel Energia, the owners of the power plant began a refurbishment of the turbines in 2005.

See also

List of power stations in Brazil

References

Energy infrastructure completed in 1975
Energy infrastructure completed in 1980
Energy infrastructure completed in 1981
Hydroelectric power stations in Paraná (state)
Dams in Paraná (state)
Dams on the Iguazu River
Rock-filled dams
Dams completed in 1975